Puranda was a Bronze Age city in Arzawa near the Astarpa river, in western Anatolia.

After Mursili II took over Apasa during his invasion of Arzawa in 1322 BC, the Hursanassan, Surudan, and Attarimman refugees who had fled there moved into Puranda. The prince of Arzawa Tapalazunauli, who had fled to the islands during the invasion, entered Puranda to lead the resistance. Mursili took Puranda and Tapalazunauli fled with his family.

Puranda was known later as Metropolis (Anatolia).

External links
The Arzawa Page
Annals of Mursili
A Journey Through Ancient Anatolia

Arzawa
Ancient Greek geography